"The Blessed Damozel" is perhaps the best known poem by Dante Gabriel Rossetti, as well as the title of his painting (and its replica) illustrating the subject. The poem was first published in 1850 in the Pre-Raphaelite journal The Germ. Rossetti subsequently revised the poem twice and republished it in 1856, 1870 and 1873.

Poem 
The poem was partially inspired by Edgar Allan Poe's poem "The Raven", with its depiction of a lover grieving on Earth over the death of his loved one. Rossetti chose to represent the situation in reverse. The poem describes the damozel observing her lover from heaven, and her unfulfilled yearning for their reunion in heaven. The first four stanzas of the poem are inscribed on the frame of the painting:

Paintings

The Blessed Damozel is the only one of Rossetti's paired pictures and poems in which the poem was completed first. Friends and patrons repeatedly urged Rossetti to illustrate his most famous poem, and he finally accepted a commission from William Graham in February 1871. After the work was completed Graham requested a predella, the lower part of the painting, on December 31, 1877.  His total cost was £1157.  Alexa Wilding modelled the damozel in Paradise, Wilfred John Hawtrey modelled the child–angel, and the probable model for the left–hand angel was May Morris.

Another, later version is in the Lady Lever Art Gallery. Frederick Richards Leyland commissioned eighteen paintings from Rossetti, not counting unfulfilled commissions.  Soon after Leyland acquired his first Rossetti painting, he and Rossetti explored the idea of a Rossetti triptych, which was eventually formed with Mnemosyne, an 1879 replica of The Blessed Damozel painted by Rossetti himself, and Proserpine. Three additional Rossetti paintings were then hung in Leyland's drawing room, all of which Leyland called "stunners."

Music
Several pieces of music were based on the poem, including those for orchestra by Debussy, Granville Bantock (1891), Edgar Bainton (1907), Ernest Farrar (1907); for piano by Arnold Bax (1906); for string quartet by Benjamin Burrows (1927); and a 1928 choral by Julius Harrison.

The poem was the inspiration for Claude Debussy's La Damoiselle élue (1888), a cantata for two soloists, female choir, and orchestra.

A 2007 popular song of the same name by Tangerine Dream appears on their album Madcap's Flaming Duty.

See also
Elsie Whitaker Martinez

Notes

Sources
 

Victorian poetry
Collections of the Lady Lever Art Gallery
Paintings by Dante Gabriel Rossetti
Paintings in the Harvard Art Museums
Angels in art
Adaptations of works by Edgar Allan Poe
Paintings based on literature